Pepe Diokno may refer to:

 Jose Diokno (1922–1987), Filipino nationalist human rights lawyer and legislator
 Pepe Diokno (director) (born 1987), Filipino motion picture director, producer and screenwriter